Ravishankar Ramachandran is an Indian molecular biologist and a senior principal scientist at the department of molecular and structural biology of the Central Drug Research Institute. Known for his studies on the molecular mechanisms of human pathogens such as Mycobacterium tuberculosis, Ramachandran is a DBT-nominated member of the Institutional Bio-Safety Committee of Babasaheb Bhimrao Ambedkar University. His studies have been documented by way of a number of articles and ResearchGate, an online repository of scientific articles has listed 142 of them. The Department of Biotechnology of the Government of India awarded him the National Bioscience Award for Career Development, one of the highest Indian science awards, for his contributions to biosciences, in 2010.

Selected bibliography

See also 

 Protein kinase inhibitor
 Tyrosine-kinase inhibitor

Notes

References

External links 
 

N-BIOS Prize recipients
Indian scientific authors
Indian medical researchers
Scientists from Delhi
Year of birth missing (living people)
Indian molecular biologists
People from New Delhi
Living people